Udau is a settlement in the Saratok division of Sarawak, Malaysia.

Neighbouring settlements include:

References

Populated places in Sarawak